Encoeliopsis is a genus of fungi in the family Helotiaceae. The genus contains four species.

References

Helotiaceae